The Environmental Justice Foundation (EJF) is a non-governmental organisation (NGO) founded in 2000 by Steve Trent and Juliette Williams that works to secure a world where natural habitats and environments can sustain, and be sustained by, the communities that depend upon them for their basic needs and livelihoods. It promotes global environmental justice, which it defines as “equal access to a secure and healthy environment for all, in a world where wildlife can thrive alongside humanity.”

EJF exposes environmental crime and destruction and the connected threats to human rights, telling the stories of those at the frontlines, and takes local fights to the very heart of governments and business across the world to secure lasting, global change.

The organisation conducts hard-hitting investigations which take place on land and at sea – providing irrefutable evidence, detailed data sets, and first-hand witness testimony – these are combined with strategic advocacy which reaches the highest levels in government to secure durable, systemic change.

Much of EJF's work involves training and equipping communities affected by environmental injustices to investigate, record and expose abuses and then campaign effectively for an equitable resolution to the issues.

Emphasis is placed on the power of film, both to record irrefutable evidence of environmental injustice and to create strong campaigning messages which can change the world.

EJF's work covers five main campaigning areas: ocean, climate, forests, wildlife and biodiversity, and cotton.

History

The Environmental Justice Foundation was founded in London, UK in 2000 and became a Registered Charity in August 2001 by Steve Trent and Juliette Williams. EJF's creation was a response to the human suffering and environmental degradation that its founders witnessed in their work as environmental campaigners.

This experience had led both founders to conclude that the basic human rights of people in the world's poorest countries often depend on those people's access to a healthy environment for food, shelter and a means to make a living.

EJF undertook its first campaign in 2001: defending a community's fishing rights in Cambodia. As a result of training and documentation programmes, a national network – the Fisheries Action Coalition Team – was founded. The Fisheries Action Coalition Team is a coalition of NGO consisting 12 NGOs, both local and international, which was localised from NGO Forum. A campaign report called Feast or Famine was produced and presented to policymakers at a meeting hosted by the British Ambassador to Cambodia, proving to be a catalyst for the issue in the country as well as securing international support.

EJF has consistently expanded its work to encompass pesticides, wildlife and biodiversity, shrimp trawling and shrimp farming, illegal, unreported and unregulated fishing, cotton production, climate change (with a particular focus on climate refugees) and forests.

Areas of work and EJF's approach

The Environmental Justice Foundation pursues its goals through investigations and campaigns to protect people, wildlife, and wild places across the world, bringing cutting-edge technologies and innovations to conserve global ocean, forests and climate. It combines grassroots activism, film-making, and effective advocacy to achieve change.

It sends its own reporters to investigate, document and compile reports of environmental and human rights abuses. It also works on the ground to help train local groups in effective investigative techniques to publicise abuses in their area, contributing high level political engagement on those issues nationally and globally.

EJF often works in partnership with other NGOs, national governments and international bodies, businesses and corporations. It also works with celebrity ambassadors to publicise its campaigns, including its patrons – environmentalist and campaigner Tony Juniper, artist Rachel Whiteread CBE, actress Emilia Fox, explorer Benedict Allen, wildlife film-maker Gordon Buchanan, artist Antony Gormley, OBE, fashion designer Katherine Hamnett CBE, and model, actress and activist Lily Cole. Nobel Prize-winner Harold Pinter, CH, CBE was an EJF Patron from 2003 to 2008.

Ocean campaign

Overfishing and illegal fishing is leaving our ocean on the edge of total collapse, and as operators look to plunder our exhausted ocean further, many resort to slave labour - enforced by violence - to keep costs down.

EJF is working to protect the ocean, end illegal fishing and stamp out the human rights abuses driven by this illicit activity. By doing so EJF aims to protect the millions of people that depend on the ocean and the magnificent and varied wildlife that calls it home.

Starting with major investigations into illegal fishing in West Africa, with the report Pirates and Profiteers launched in 2005, EJF's ocean work now focuses on seven key areas.

Ending the scourge of illegal fishing around the globe

EJF's investigations have driven unprecedented action to tackle illegal fishing. Their investigations into vessels from Panama, Thailand, Ghana and South Korea, among others, have fed into the EU's ‘carding’ system to work with governments to eradicate illegal fishing in their fleets and sanction them if no action is taken.

Recent EJF reports and investigations have shone a light on dolphin killing in Taiwan's fishing fleet, human rights abuses on Chinese-owned vessels in Ghana, the links between illegal fishing in West Africa and seafood consumption in Europe, and resulted in the blacklisting of vessels fishing illegally around the globe.

Combating seafood slavery

With fish stocks nearing breaking point and global demand at an all-time high, vessels are now going further afield – often fishing illegally in other nations’ territories – and staying longer at sea, to bring back ever-diminishing catches. This has created a wave of trafficked workers forced into slave labour to crew vessels, reduce companies’ costs, and supply the global seafood market with cheap products.

EJF's reports, films and investigations have driven governments to act and introduce real legislation to tackle modern slavery at sea.

Protecting marine biodiversity

Many marine and coastal ecosystems are on the brink of collapse: 90% of the world's large ocean fish have been lost since the 1950s. EJF works to document and expose the environmentally destructive fishing techniques that put our ocean's health at risk and the illegal trade and poaching of marine species including sharks, rays and turtles that threaten these creatures’ future.

In West Africa, EJF's turtle patrollers walk the beaches to make sure nesting turtles can return safely to the ocean. In Liberia, EJF has built a community of wildlife defenders, and played a key role in Liberia's National Plan of Action to protect sharks and rays. In Thailand, EJF's Net Free Seas project takes discarded fishing nets, lethal for wildlife, out of the ocean and into the circular economy, producing sustainable new products including protective equipment for the fight against COVID-19.

Securing sustainable fisheries

Since 2017, EJF has worked with local partner Hen Mpoano to improve the lives of fishers and promote food security across Ghana. It has worked with almost 60 communities across the 10 districts in Ghana's Central Region and in the Volta Estuary in a bid to safeguard marine resources for current and future generations of local fishers.

In West Africa, EJF empowers local communities to take a stand against illegal fishing activities, providing the much-needed evidence for the government to take action against these illicit practices. It supports local fishers to understand and protect their rights in fisheries management. It promotes the fair allocation of tenure rights to protect fishers’ landing sites from the encroachment of tourism and other industrial activities. It conducts research and political advocacy highlighting the impact of illegal fishing and overfishing on peoples’ most basic human rights. Finally, it identifies and promotes alternative livelihoods to help broaden fisher communities’ economic basis and support the long term sustainability of Ghana's fish stocks.

Improving transparency in global fisheries

Illegal fishing and modern-day slavery thrive in the shadows, avoiding scrutiny by government, industry and consumers. To stop it, global fisheries must become much more transparent. EJF's Ten Principles for Global Transparency detail straightforward, practical steps which states can take to bring fisheries into the light. EJF has advocated for the adoption of these principles with individual governments and with international institutions like the European Commission.

EJF's Charter for Transparency public awareness campaign has gained the support of major retailers in the UK, which have committed to sourcing sustainable, transparent seafood, and its reports have raised awareness of the tactics used by unscrupulous operators to avoid sanctions for illegal fishing.

Building a stronger voice for community fisheries in Liberia

An estimated 80% of Liberia's population is dependent on fish for essential protein. Small-scale fisheries also provide employment for 33,000 people in the country and play a critical role in the economy, accounting for up to 10% of GDP. But illegal fishing is threatening this vital source of food and livelihoods.

EJF aims to help secure legal, sustainable and equitable fisheries in Liberia. It works on empowering communities to co-manage fisheries and reduce illegal fishing, building lasting sustainability and social equity into Liberia's fishing sector. In particular it works to empower women, who make up 60% of the fisheries workforce. The project is part of the EU-Liberia Agricultural partnership programme, part-funded by the European Union, and continues almost a decade of EJF work in Liberia.

Promoting the role of ocean ecosystems in climate policy

EJF's 2021 blue carbon campaign gained the support of public figures, over 90 NGOs and politicians in Europe, the UK and beyond. It called for the vital role of ocean ecosystems in keeping our climate stable to be recognised and built momentum for ocean protection in the run up to the COP26 talks in Glasgow, where unprecedented new commitments were made to safeguard ocean ecosystems.

Climate campaign

EJF sees climate change as an existential threat to humanity. As global temperatures hit levels not seen since records began, extreme weather events continue to cause major disruption and the rising cost of inaction leaves the poorest and most vulnerable people on our planet worst affected.

EJF believes the climate crisis is both an environmental and human rights issue, and that those hit first and worst by climate breakdown should have their voices heard.

At 2021's COP26 in Glasgow, they hosted events, art exhibitions and met with political leaders to push for decisive action on the climate crisis. They supported six young climate activists with bursaries to attend COP, giving them a chance to share their message, and interviewed further climate activists around the world as part of their "Voices missing from COP" series.

Their climate campaign aims to secure international protection for the world's growing population of climate refugees, end the conflicts associated with climate change, and build momentum towards a zero-carbon global circular economy. Their “Climate Manifesto” in 2021 outlined the steps world leaders must take now for a fairer, safer future.

In 2009, EJF launched their international campaign to protect climate refugees with the report No Place Like Home. This report, presented at the European Parliament in 2011, addresses the need for a legal definition of climate refugees and global efforts to provide them with legal protections. This was followed by the report and film Beyond Borders in 2017 and travelling photography exhibitions of portraits of people displaced by climate change, including at the National Theatre in London in 2018.

In 2021, EJF brought international attention to some of those hit hardest by the climate crisis through their campaign and report on international legal protections for climate refugees, highlighting the lack of support which is currently available for those forced to leave their homes by extreme weather. EJF continues to campaign to make protections for climate refugees a reality.

Through EJF investigations, like The Gathering Storm, and through filmed interviews with high level policy makers and military experts, EJF is collating robust evidence from around the world to show how climate change is acting as a catalyst for conflict and instability. EJF's view of climate change is that it is a threat multiplier, and all governments should act to meet the Paris Agreement to remove this threat of conflict.

From global petitions calling for policy change to collaborations with influential designers including Dame Vivienne Westwood and Katherine Hamnett, EJF has shone the spotlight on the issue of the climate crisis more broadly and supported the global call for climate action.

EJF also purchased an ancient woodland in Wales in 2018 to store carbon and protect wildlife, showing an institutional commitment to tackling climate change directly.

Forests campaign

Forests are the most diverse ecosystems on land, home to around 80% of the world's terrestrial wildlife. Around 1.6 billion people depend directly on forests for their livelihoods, for food, shelter, and fuel.

EJF is campaigning to stop the senseless destruction of these crucial habitats. Mangroves are one of the most important habitats on the planet but are being rapidly wiped out. EJF has long worked to defend mangroves. Combining their seafood and forests expertise in hard-hitting investigations into the devastation of mangroves for shrimp farming, EJF has been a voice for change since 2003. Documenting the testimonies of people directly affected by deforestation in Bangladesh, EJF built both an environmental case against shrimp farming and a human rights one – informed by the suffering inflicted by this industry.

In 2007, EJF worked with the Brazilian coalition SOS Abrolhos to successfully protect coastal areas from plans for a shrimp farm the size of Heathrow. Previously, their training for the Forum for the Defence of the Ceara Coast led to a film being shown on Brazilian television and at public hearings into shrimp farm development.

Also working to protect terrestrial rainforests, EJF is part of a host of environmental NGOs demanding change and monitoring policy making in Europe closely, as parliamentarians realise that there is nothing ‘green’ about palm oil biodiesel.

EU biofuels policy is beginning to take account of the emissions caused by the deforestation and drainage of carbon-rich ecosystems. The revised Renewable Energy Directive – which was put to the European Parliament by the Commission in March 2019 – expelled palm oil from the EU's renewable energy targets, with reductions from 2023 and final phase-out by 2030.

Wildlife and biodiversity campaign

EJF first collaborated with the NGO Education for Nature Vietnam (ENV) in 2003 which was established in 2000 as Vietnam's first non-governmental organization focused on conservation of nature and wildlife, to combat illegal bear farming. EJF reported that estimated 4000 Asiatic black bears and sun bears were being kept illegally in Vietnam's bear farms. Caged adult bears had their bile regularly extracted for use in traditional medicines and tonics.

Between 2003 and 2009, EJF provided ENV with video, media, communications and advocacy training and equipment. It helped conduct undercover investigations and lead public campaigns on Vietnamese television, and supplied camera operators and editors and further training.

In 2003, EJF published the report Viral diseases from wildlife in China: Could SARS happen again?, which identified China's commercial wildlife markets as a potential source of future deadly pandemics. When this was borne out by the COVID-19 pandemic in 2020, EJF launched a campaign to ban commercial wildlife markets worldwide, with a petition signed on six continents and a new report, Why Ban Commercial Wildlife Markets? Restrictions on commercial wildlife markets are tightening around the globe, and public opinion is starting to turn against them, even in countries with extensive commercial wildlife markets.

EJF also works with local biologists and indigenous people in Brazil's Pantanal wetland, a globally important habitat home to giant anteaters, jaguars and more, publishing the report Paradise Lost? detailing how to protect this ecosystem in 2020.

Cotton campaign

EJF campaigns to reduce the human and environmental costs of cotton production, exposing human rights abuses, pesticide misuse, water-shortages and calling for supply-chain transparency. It investigated and exposed state-sponsored forced child labour in Uzbekistan resulting in immediate improvements to international supply chains and retailer policies.

The EJF award-winning film and report White Gold, covering human rights abuses in the Uzbek cotton industry, was released in 2005, with a global campaign on “The True Costs of Cotton” in the following year. This was covered on BBC Newsnight, and major retailers Marks and Spencer and Tesco immediately dropped Uzbek cotton as a result. Also in 2006, EJF launched Just For, selling ethically produced organic cotton clothing in collaboration with a range of leading designers.

The Uzbek government signed conventions on child labour in 2008 as a direct result of EJF's pressure, and EJF's global cotton campaign has continued with reports on the role of the clothing industry in driving climate change, such as 2020's Moral Fibre.

Pesticides campaign

One of EJF's first programs was its campaign for national and ultimately a global ban on the manufacture and use of chemical pesticide endosulfan. Categorized by the United States Environmental Protection Agency as a ‘highly hazardous' substance, endosulfan has been compared to DDT in its potential for environmental harm, and it is highly dangerous for humans.

EJF began documenting the use of endosulfan in Cambodia in 2002 and published a report called Death in Small Doses the same year. Working with CEDAC (Centre d'Etude et de Développement Agricole Cambodgien), a Cambodian NGO, EJF documented widespread use of endosulfan by Cambodian farmers and recorded numerous safety concerns, including a lack of protective equipment and exposure of children, homes, livestock and family food crops.

A short briefing entitled End of the Road for Endosulfan  was used to convince the Cambodian Environment Minister to ban endosulfan in the country. This briefing was later cited in the European Union's 2008 proposal to include endosulfan in the Annexes of the Stockholm Convention.

In 2011, EJF announced on their website that it was "delighted to announce that, after extensive review and debate, we have finally reached the end of the road for chemical pesticide endosulfan" following news that on Friday April 29, 2011, national delegates at the fifth conference of parties (COP5) agreed to list endosulfan under Annex A of the Stockholm Convention on Persistent Organic Pollutants (POPs).

References

External links
 

Charities based in England
Environmental justice organizations
International environmental organizations
Organisations based in Bath, Somerset